The 2017–18 Central Coast Mariners FC season was the club's 13th season since its establishment in 2004. The club participated in the A-League for the 13th time and the FFA Cup for the 4th time.

Review and events

Pre-season
Immediately after the end of the 2016–17 season, it was announced that goalkeepers Paul Izzo and Ivan Necevski; and attacking players Roy O'Donovan and Fábio Ferreira would be leaving the club.

Players

Squad information

Transfers in

Transfers out

Contracts extensions

Technical staff

Statistics

Squad statistics

|-
|colspan="19"|Players no longer at the club:

Pre-season and friendlies

Competitions

Overall

A-League

League table

Results summary

Results by round

Matches

FFA Cup

References

External links
 Official website

Central Coast Mariners
Central Coast Mariners FC seasons